Banque Libano-Française (BLF, Arabic: البنك اللبناني الفرنسي) is a Lebanese bank holding number 10 on Banque du Liban List of Banks. It was established as a joint stock company in 1967. Its head office is located at the Beirut Liberty Plaza Building, Hamra District, Beirut, Lebanon. It is one of the leading banks in Lebanon and an important participant in the Lebanese economy. 

As at end of January 2023, BLF operates in Lebanon through a network of 43 branches, 1 e-branch and 186 ATMs. Abroad, BLF Group is present in France and Cyprus (Banque SBA), in Switzerland (LF Finance Suisse), in the United Arab Emirates (a representative office in Abu Dhabi), and in Nigeria (a representative office in Lagos). It has 937 employees, including 872 persons employed in Lebanon. 

It is also available through several digital channels, namely the My BLF mobile apps. 

While it has historically been a commercial bank, the Bank has diversified its activities and currently provides banking services in five principal areas: commercial banking, investment banking, retail banking, private banking, treasury and capital markets and correspondent banking.

BLF is also an active member of the Association of Banks in Lebanon.

History
 Banque Libano-Française (BLF) was created in 1930 as a branch of the French bank, Compagnie Algérienne.
 In 1967, BLF became a bank established under the Lebanese law, with 70% French shareholding.
 In 1970, Banque Indosuez acquired a 5% direct interest in the Bank capital.
 In 1973, Banque Indosuez increased its stake to 20% through a partial acquisition of the shares of Compagnie Française de Crédit et de Banque (former Compagnie Algérienne de Crédit et de Banque), which became known as Parthena Investment.
 In 1992, Banque Indosuez increased its shareholding in Banque Libano-Française to 51%.
 In 1999, BLF acquired 100% of Crédit Agricole Indosuez Liban (CAIL), a financial institution specialized in securities brokerage and portfolio management.
 In 2004, Crédit Agricole Group decided to reduce its exposure in Lebanon, in anticipation of the implementation of Basle II. Therefore, Calyon (former Crédit Agricole Indosuez) reduced its participation in the Bank to 9%.
 In 2006, BLF finalized the acquisition of 78.3% of Banque SBA shares, established in France (Paris) with a financial subsidiary in Geneva known as LF Finance (Switzerland) SA and a branch in Cyprus (Limassol).
 In 2009, BLF obtained an official license from the UAE Central Bank to establish a Representative Office in Abu Dhabi.
 In 2012, the Bank reinforced its operations in the MENA region by opening a Representative Office in Lagos, Nigeria and a branch in Baghdad, Iraq. 
 On September 1, 2014, Farid Raphaël, founder of Banque Libano-Française and its Chairman General Manager from 1979, passed away.
 On September 15, 2014, Walid Raphaël was elected by the Board of Directors as Chairman General Manager of the Bank.
 In 2015, the Bank teamed up with Allianz SNA to launch 5 new non-life insurance plans to help protect its clients against various risks.
 In January 2016, BLF launched the international architecture competition to build its new headquarters. 
 In July 2016, it announced Norwegian-American studio Snøhetta as the winner of the competition, selected by the International Jury. 
 In 2017, the Bank expanded its local network to 58 branches and more than 172 ATMs.
 In 2018, BLF opened two branches in Kfarhbab and Tyre-Hoche, expanding its local network to 60 branches and more than 181 ATMs, and its first e-branch in Mar Mikhaël. 
 In 2019, BLF continued to implement the Bank's digital strategy with the opening of another e-branch in Badaro, the launch of "My LTBY" application for the youth, and the enhancement of "My BLF" features. In the last quarter of 2019, the Bank had to cope with the terrible socio-economic crisis that hit Lebanon.
 In 2020, Banque Libano-Française continued to face the terrible socio-economic crisis in Lebanon and focuses its efforts on helping both clients and employees to overcome the situation.

Board of directors
 Walid Raphaël (Chairman)
 Elie Nahas (Group Chairman)

Capital and financial figures
BLF capital is LBP 265 billion.

See also 

 List of Banks in Lebanon
 Banque du Liban
 Bank Audi
 Byblos Bank
 Fransabank
 Economy of Lebanon

References

Banks of Lebanon
Companies based in Beirut
1967 establishments in Asia
Lebanese brands